The BMW M3 is a high-performance version of the BMW 3 Series, developed by BMW's in-house motorsport division, BMW M GmbH. M3 models have been produced for every generation of 3 Series since the E30 M3 was introduced in 1986.

The initial model was available in a coupé body style, with a convertible body style added soon after. M3 saloons were available during the E36 (1994–1999) and E90 (2008–2012) generations. Since 2014, the coupé and convertible models have been rebranded as the 4 Series range, making the high-performance variant the M4, so that generation of 3 Series saw the M3 produced only as a saloon. In 2020, the M3 was produced as an estate (Touring) for the first time, alongside the saloon.

E30 generation (1986–1991)  

The first BMW M3 was based on the E30 3 Series and was intended to be a homologation special to satisfy the Deutsche Tourenwagen Meisterschaft and Group A Touring rules, which required a total of 5,000 cars to be built. It was presented to the public at the 1985 Frankfurt Motor Show, and began production from March 1986 to June 1991. The E30 M3 was mainly produced in the coupé body style, but limited volumes of convertibles were also produced.

The front splitter, the rear apron, sill panels, as well as changes to the body in the area of the rear window (C-pillar) and the bootlid improved the aerodynamics. For aerodynamic reasons, the rear window was flattened and the tailgate was made of light, glass-reinforced plastic raised by approximately 40 mm for better air flow. The changes over the rear of the car resulted in lower lift forces and better straight-line stability. In addition, the windscreen was glued in – not, as with the other E30 models, framed with a window rubber and piping. The only exterior body panels the regular 3 Series and the M3 shared were the bonnet, roof panel, sunroof.

The brake calipers, discs and master cylinder were unique to the M3 model.

The transmission was a Getrag 265 5-speed manual. European models were outfitted with a dogleg version with close ratios and a 1:1 ratio for fifth gear. North American models used a traditional shift pattern and had wider gear spacing with an overdriven fifth gear. A clutch-type limited-slip differential was standard equipment.

In 2004, Sports Car International named the E30 M3 number six on the list of Top Sports Cars of the 1980s. In 2007, Automobile Magazine included the E30 M3 in their "5 greatest drivers cars of all time" under their 25 Greatest Cars of All Time.

Engine 

The E30 M3 used the BMW S14 four-cylinder engine, a high-revving DOHC design with a head closely based on that of the BMW S38 six-cylinder engine and the block from the BMW M10 four-cylinder engine with a 7,250 rpm redline.

Suspension 
Differences from the standard E30 models included:
 5-stud wheel hubs
 225/45R16 Pirelli P700-Z tyres.
 offset control arm bushings in the front suspension, for increased caster angle
 aluminium control arms
 revised front strut tubes with bolt on kingpins and swaybar mounted to strut tube, similar to the E28 5 Series
 front wheel bearings and brake caliper bolt spacing from the E28 5 Series
 310mm slotted front & 295mm slotted rear discs
 6 piston front and 4 piston rear calipers
 stainless steel braided brake hoses

Special editions

Evolution 

Other changes included larger wheels (16 × 7.5 inches), thinner rear and side window glass, a lighter bootlid, a deeper front splitter and an additional rear spoiler. A total of 505 cars were produced, including 40 sold in France as the "Tour de Corse".

Sport Evolution 
Sport Evolution models have enlarged front bumper openings and an adjustable multi-position front splitter and rear wing. Brake cooling ducts were installed in place of front foglights.

Ravaglia and Cecotto editions 
In April 1989, the Ravaglia and Cecotto limited editions were released, both named after Deutsche Tourenwagen Meisterschaft (DTM) racing drivers. The production run for the Ravaglia Edition consisted of 25 cars.

M3 Pickup prototype 
In 1986, BMW produced an "M3 Pickup" prototype pickup truck, based on the convertible model. The M3 Pickup used the narrower body of regular E30 models and was originally powered by the 2.0-litre version of the S14 engine from the Italian-specification M3. It was used by BMW M as a transporter for roughly 26 years before it was officially retired in 2012.

Production volumes 
Total production of the E30 M3 was 17,970 cars.

Motorsport 

The M3 E30 competed in many forms of motorsport and was highly successful in touring car racing. The E30 M3 won the 24 Hours Nürburgring five times (1989, 1990, 1991, 1992 and 1994) and the Spa 24 Hours four times (1987, 1988, 1990 and 1992), often competing against cars with significantly larger or turbocharged engines.

To keep the car competitive in racing following year-to-year homologation rules changes, homologation specials were produced and sold in limited volumes. These include the Evo 1, Evo 2, and Sport Evolution, with upgrades including weight reduction, improved aerodynamics, taller front wheel arches (to allow 18-inch wheels to be used in DTM racing), bigger brake ducts and more power output from the engine.

The M3 also competed as a rally car, with Prodrive-prepared examples contesting several national championships and selected rounds of the World Rally Championship between 1987 and 1989. The M3 was not very competitive with the four-wheel drive cars on loose surfaces, but it was a very effective car on asphalt. Its most notable success was a victory on the Tour de Corse in 1987, driven by Bernard Béguin.

Championships 
 World Touring Car Championship; 1 title (1987)
 European Touring Car Championship; 2 titles (1987 and 1988)
 British Touring Car Championship; 2 titles (1988 and 1991)
 Italia Superturismo Championship; 4 titles (1987, 1989, 1990 and 1991)
 Deutsche Tourenwagen Meisterschaft; 2 titles (1987 and 1989)
 Australian Touring Car Championship; 1 title (1987)
 Australian 2.0 Litre Touring Car Championship; 1 title (1993)
 Australian Manufacturers' Championship; 2 titles (1987 and 1988  – both shared)
 AMSCAR Series; 2 titles (1987, 1991)
 Irish Tarmac Rally Championship; 1 title (1990)
Japanese Touring Car Championship; 7 titles in JTC-2 (1987, 1988, 1989, 1990, 1991, 1992, 1993)

E36 generation (1992–1999)  

The M3 model of the E36 3 Series was released in November 1992 and was initially available as a coupé only, with a convertible version added in 1994. A saloon version was also added in December 1994, to fill in the gap caused by the lack of the M5 saloon model between the end of E34 M5 production in 1995 and the launch of the E39 M5 in 1998.

In September 1995, a facelift version of the coupé was introduced. The facelift changes were applied to the saloon model in November 1995 and the convertible model in February 1996.

The facelift also saw the introduction of a 6-speed "SMG" automated manual transmission, the first time an automated transmission was available on an M3 outside the United States. The SMG transmission was praised for its fast shift times and operation in performance situations, but criticized for behavior in everyday driving situations.

In 1996, BMW M hand-built an E36 M3 Compact prototype as an M-car which would appeal to younger customers. It included various performance and styling features of the E36 M3, including the 3.2-litre S50 engine. The M3 Compact was reviewed in the German magazine "", but never reached production.

Engine 

The E36 M3 is powered by the BMW S50 straight-six engine. It was the first M3 to use a six-cylinder engine, which has since been used in the majority of M3 models (albeit in turbocharged form since 2014).

North American models (except for the limited edition Canadian "M3 Euro-Spec" model) used the less powerful BMW S50B30US engine instead.

North American models used the less powerful BMW S52 engine instead.

Special editions

M3 GT (Europe) 

In 1994, BMW produced the limited-edition M3 GT as a racing homologation special for Europe, in order to compete in the FIA-GT class II, IMSA GT and international long-distance races. A total of 356 cars were produced, all in left-hand drive for mainland Europe. The UK received a special GT trim limited to 50 cars with only the cosmetic upgrades of the homologation special.

All M3 GTs only came in one single colour, "British Racing Green". Other changes include a deeper and adjustable front splitter, higher rear double wing, aluminum doors, wheels measuring 17 x 7.5 inches at the front and 17 x 8.5 inches at the rear, stiffer front suspension, a cross-brace and a strut brace.

M3 Evolution Imola Individual

The M3 Evolution Imola Individual is a limited-edition variant of the M3 (50 for the United Kingdom). The engine and performance characteristics of the car were unchanged from the 1996 European M3, and a special exterior and interior colour combination was chosen by BMW UK: "Imola Red" (405) paint with Nappa leather seats in Imola Red and Amaretta suede bolsters in anthracite. It also included side airbags, the M3 GT Class II rear spoiler, front class II corner splitter extensions, electric seats, and double-spoke polished alloy wheels.

Prior to the release of the Imola Individual there was a pre-production model made which was used as the basis of the special edition. It featured the Class II front splitter and rear spoiler, special order Imola Red paint, special order Nappa leather and Anthracite Amaretta suede interior, SMG gearbox, GSM phone kit, headlamp washers and double-spoke polished alloy wheels.

M3 Lightweight (US) 

Following the introduction of the E36 M3, racing teams in the United States began pressuring BMW for a homologation version in order to compete in sports-car racing. As a result, the 'M3 Lightweight' was introduced in 1995. The cars came without a radio (although the speakers were installed and the car pre-wired for the radio), air conditioning, leather seats, tool kit or a sunroof. The doors have aluminium skins. There is no under bonnet insulation blanket, and the boot only has carpet on the floor. The under body insulation is thinner and there is special carpeting to lower weight. Overall the changes resulted in a weight  less than a regular M3. The wheels are 17 inches in diameter, with a width of 7.5 inches at the front and 8.5 inches at the rear. The tyres fitted were 235/40ZR17.

Powertrain changes included the removal of the top speed limiter and a shorter differential ratio (3.23 compared to 3.15). Suspension upgrades consisted of shorter springs from the European-specification M3. Before being sold, the M3 Lightweights were sent to Prototype Technology Group Racing in Virginia for final preparation, which included the front and rear Motorsport flag decals, and "trunk kit". In the boot there was a dual-pickup oil pump (from the European-specification M3), front strut bar, lower cross-brace, spacer blocks to raise the rear wing, and an adjustable front splitter. Each owner was given a 1-page legal document to sign acknowledging that any installation of boot items voided the new car warranty.

All M3 Lightweight cars were produced in the "Alpine White" exterior colour, with the Motorsports flag decals on the left front and right rear corners of the car. There is a fixed wing on the bootlid, some carbon fibre interior trim, and the badges on the side moulding and dash read "BMW Motorsport International".

Although BMW promised to build approximately 100 cars, BMW never released the production numbers of M3 Lightweights built. However, it is estimated that approximately 125 were built.

Canadian Edition 
Prior to the release of the North American specification M3, BMW Canada sold 45 of the European specification M3s. At the time, BMW North America was opposed to importing the E36 M3 (due to its high price and the poor sales of the previous M3). The Canadian Edition M3 was imported using a loophole that allows low volumes of Norwegian-certified cars to be sold in Canada. Despite a high price of nearly $60,000 CAD, all 45 cars were sold in 3 days in early 1994. As with other European specification M3s, these 45 cars had the  version of the S50 engine, oil temperature gauge and glass headlights. Each of the Canadian Edition cars has an individually-numbered plaque on the glovebox which reads "S50 B30 Limited Production Canadian Edition". The cars also have a numbered engraved plaque in both the glovebox and the custom leather case which holds the owner's manuals.

When the North American specification M3 was released in 1995, it was initially not available in Canada. Sales of the North American M3 in Canada began in 1997.

M3-R (Australia) 
In order to race in the Australian Super Production series, fifteen M3-Rs were sold by BMW Australia in 1994. Four of the cars were used for the race series, while the remaining eleven were sold to the general public. Buyers were required to possess a CAMS motorsport licence in order to purchase an M3-R.

The cars were delivered to the workshop of the Frank Gardner racing team for final preparation. A bolt-in FIA-approved roll cage was a factory option. Suspension upgrades consisted of new springs, adjustable struts and rear perches. Engine upgrades consisted of AC Schnitzer camshafts, dual pickup sump, an oil restrictor in the head and a cold air snorkel into the air filter box replacing the left hand foglight.

Other changes included four piston front brake calipers, a shorter (3.25:1) differential ratio, the driveshaft from the M5, a twin-plate clutch, a non-functional rear seat, no air conditioning, a deeper front splitter and a larger rear spoiler. The cars were individually numbered with a plaque fitted to the centre console near the handbrake.

M3 GTR (Germany) 
The E36 M3 GTR is the road-going version of the competition machine built to compete in the 1994 ADAC German GT Cup Touring Car series.

Production 
Production of the E36 M3 began in September 1992 and was discontinued in August 1999.

The majority of cars were produced at the BMW Regensburg factory in Germany; however, a small number of low compression right-hand drive cars were assembled at BMW's plant in Rosslyn, South Africa. In total, 46,525 coupés, 12,114 convertibles and 12,603 saloon were produced. The saloon ceased production in December 1997, the coupé in late 1998, and the convertible in December 1999.

North American models
Despite being released in other countries in 1992, the E36 M3 was not sold in the United States until 1995. Other notable differences included an optional 5-speed ZF 5HP torque-converter automatic transmission, suspension changes, and single piece brake discs (instead of floating discs). The changes were made in order to reduce the price of the M3, as the US dealers believed the European specification M3 would be too expensive to sell well.

The manual gearbox remained a 5-speed, despite the European versions being upgraded to a 6-speed version.

US sales figures include a total of 18,961 coupés, 7,760 saloon and 6,211 convertibles.

Motorsport 

The introduction of the E36 M3 coincided with BMW's withdrawal from the Deutsche Tourenwagen Meisterschaft (DTM), resulting in BMW focussing instead on the 318i and 320i models in the Super Tourenwagen Cup. Nonetheless, the E36 M3 competed in many motorsport events. In 1993, the E36 M3 GTR won the German ADAC GT Cup, driven by Johnny Cecotto. The M3 GT competed in the European FIA GT Championship.

In the United States, the Prototype Technology Group (PTG) Racing in Virginia ran the E36 M3 in the IMSA GT Championship. In the 1996 IMSA GT Championship, the M3 won 4 races in the GTS-2 class and BMW won the manufacturer's championship. In the 1997 IMSA GT Championship, the M3 won 8 races in the GTS-3 class, with BMW winning the manufacturer's championship again and Bill Auberlen winning the driver's championship. In the 1998 IMSA GT Championship, the M3 won 5 races and BMW won the manufacturer's championship in the GT3 class. The same year, the M3 won 4 races in the GT2 class. The M3 also competed in the 2000 American Le Mans Series, taking one win in the GT class.

In Australia, the M3-R competed in the Australian GT Production Car Championship.

E46 generation (2000–2006)  

The M3 version of the E46 3 Series was produced in coupé and convertible body styles. The E46 M3 is powered by the S54 straight-six engine and has a 0- acceleration time of 5.1 seconds for the coupé, with either the manual or SMG-II transmission. The skidpad cornering results are 0.89g for the coupé and 0.81g for the convertible.

The available transmissions were a Getrag 420G 6-speed manual transmission or an SMG-II 6-speed automated manual transmission, which was based on the Getrag 420G. The SMG-II used an electrohydraulically actuated clutch, and gear shifts could be selected via the shift lever or paddles mounted on the steering wheel. The SMG-II was praised for its fast shift times and racetrack performance, but some people found its shifts to be delayed and lurching in stop-start traffic.

Total production of the E46 M3 was 56,133 coupés and 29,633 convertibles. The cars were assembled at the BMW Regensburg factory in Germany, and production was from September 2000 until August 2006, for a total of 85,766 cars.

An M3 Touring station wagon prototype was built to evaluate the feasibility of building an M3 model on the existing platform of the E46 station wagon (especially the integration of the M3's wider rear wheel arches onto the wagon body). The prototype did not reach production.

Engine 

The  S54 engine is the final evolution of the BMW S50 naturally aspirated straight-six engine. As with most M engines, the S54 has individual throttle bodies for each cylinder, with electronic throttle control (drive-by-wire) operation of the throttles being a new feature for the S54.

Development and launch 
Concept design of the M3 began in 1997. The head of exterior design was Ulf Weidhase and the head of interior design was Martina Bachmann.

The M3 was previewed at the 1999 International Motor Show Germany as a concept, resembling the final production version very closely. The final production version was first introduced in October 2000 at the Geneva Motor Show, with the new 3.2L S54 M-tuned inline-6 engine.

Special editions

CSL 

The BMW M3 CSL (meaning 'Coupé Sport Lightweight') is a limited edition version of the M3 that was produced in 2004, with production totalling to 1,383 cars. It was available in two colours: "Silver Grey Metallic" and "Black Sapphire Metallic".

As its name suggests, an emphasis was put on reducing weight.

The boot floor cover was made of lightweight fibre-board (not cardboard as infamously described on the Top Gear television show). The CSL discarded a large proportion of the M3's sound insulation, electric seats, navigation system, air conditioning and stereo (the latter two were able to be re-added as no-cost options). The interior includes fibreglass front racing bucket seats, a fibreglass backing for the rear seats, and carbon fibre for the centre console, door panels, door trim and head-liner. The steering wheel has just a single button which activates the M track mode, instead of the buttons for cruise control, stereo, and phone controls on the regular M3. The CSL retained the 50:50 weight distribution of the regular M3.

The wheels were increased in size to 19 inches. BMW took the unusual approach of supplying the CSL with semi-slick tyres (Michelin Pilot Sport Cup). These tyres provided high grip levels once warmed up on a racetrack, but poor performance on wet roads and when below their operating temperature. A warning label was included in the CSL to inform drivers about driving in cold or wet conditions. The brakes were upgraded with larger floating discs at the front and larger pistons at the rear.

The suspension system was revised with stiffer springs, upgraded shock absorbers and a quicker ratio for the steering rack (14.5:1 vs 15.4:1 on the regular M3). The electronic stability control was retuned and an "M track mode" was added, allowing higher thresholds before the system intervened.

This is due to the use of sharper profile camshafts, a bigger air intake with carbon fibre manifold, a refinement of the exhaust manifold, and slightly different exhaust valves. The top speed was electronically limited as standard, but buyers with a current motorsport licence could order the CSL with the speed limiter removed. The sole transmission available was the 6-speed SMG II automated transmission, with revised software resulting in shift times of 80 milliseconds.

The aerodynamics were also revised, including a carbon fibre front splitter that improved downforce at high speeds by 50%, and a carbon fibre rear diffuser. The front bumper had a distinct hole that is used to draw cool air into the newly designed air intake. The bootlid was redesigned to incorporate a raised lip, unlike the regular M3 where one is simply added onto a flat boot.

Prototype CSL 
In 2022, BMW M revealed a special V8 prototype engine (full model code S62B40) for the M3 CSL which was previously fitted to the E39 M5 and the E52 Z8. The S62 was BMW's first V8 engine to have double-VANOS (variable valve timing on the intake and exhaust camshafts).

Competition Package / CS 
In 2005, a special edition was introduced which used several parts from the CSL. This model was called the M3 Competition Package (ZCP) in the United States and mainland Europe, and the M3 CS in the United Kingdom. Compared to the regular M3, the Competition Package includes:
 19-inch BBS alloy wheels: 19in×8in at the front and 19in×9.5in at the rear.
 Stiffer springs (which were carried over to the regular M3 from 12/04).
 Faster ratio steering rack of 14.5:1 (compared with the regular M3's ratio of 15.4:1) as with the CSL
 Steering wheel from the CSL
 M-track mode for the electronic stability control, as with the CSL.
 The CSL's larger front brake discs (but with the regular M3 front calipers) and rear brake calipers with larger pistons.
 Alcantara steering wheel and handbrake covers.

The engine, gearbox, and other drivetrain components are the same as the standard M3.

GTR road car 

In order to homologate the M3 GTR for racing, a road version was produced in 2001. The road cars were built alongside the GTR race cars in the special vehicles department of BMW's Regensburg Plant.

As with the race car, the GTR road car was powered by the 4.0-litre P60 V8 engine. The transmission was a six-speed manual and the differential was the same variable locking unit as used in the race car.

Weight reduction measures included a carbon fibre front bumper, rear bumper and rear wing.

The 2005 video game Need for Speed: Most Wanted featured the M3 GTR on the game's cover art as the protagonist's car in a custom blue-and-silver livery. Road & Track, who collaborated on the first Need for Speed video game, described the game's custom M3 GTR as being "so iconic that fans still recreate the livery in real life." Once searched about the M3 GTR, nearly 85% of the results will relate the car to Need for Speed: Most Wanted.

North American models 
The North American models used the same S54 engine as in other countries (unlike the previous generation, which used lower performance engines in the United States).

The CSL model was not sold in the North American market.

Motorsport 

In the United States, the E46 M3 competed in the 2000 American Le Mans Series GT category and finished third in the championship. The straight-six engine was viewed as uncompetitive compared to the Porsche 996 GT3, therefore BMW began to develop a new M3 racing car based around a more powerful engine. The resulting E46 GTR racing car was introduced in February 2001 and was powered by a  version of the  P60 V8 engine. With a more powerful engine than the straight-six powered M3 versions (which were outpaced by the competition), the GTR won the 2001 American Le Mans Series GT category, driven by Jörg Müller.

The eligibility of the GTR was the subject of controversy, with some rival teams believing that the GTR was an in-house prototype vehicle rather than a production model available for purchase by the general public. The ALMS homologation rules for 2001 required the M3 GTR road car to be sold on at least two continents within twelve months of the rules being issued, which BMW claimed to fulfill by stating that 10 GTR road cars were available for sale. The ALMS rules were altered for 2002, now requiring that 100 cars and 1,000 engines must be built for a car to qualify without penalties. The GTR road car was never intended for production on this scale, so BMW withdrew the GTR from competition at this point.

In 2003, the M3 GTR returned to competition at the 24 Hours Nürburgring, with two cars run by Schnitzer Motorsport. The GTR won the 24 Hours Nürburgring in 2004 and 2005, and competed in the 24 Hours Spa.

E90/E92/E93 generation (2007–2013)  

The M3 model of the E90/E92/E93 3 Series range was powered by the BMW S65 V8 engine and was produced in saloon, convertible and coupé body styles. The E9x is the first and only standard production M3 powered by a V8 engine as its successor would revert to using a straight 6 engine.

Initially, the M3 was produced with a 6-speed manual transmission. In April 2008, the E90/E92/E93 M3 became the first BMW to be available with a dual-clutch transmission when the 7-speed Getrag "M-DCT" transmission was introduced as an option.

The official 0 to  acceleration times for the coupé and saloon are 4.6 seconds with the DCT transmission (4.8 seconds with the manual transmission) and 5.1 seconds for the convertible.

The E90 and E92 versions received many positive reviews, including "the greatest all-around car in the world", "the finest car on the market, period" and "the best, most complete car in the world".

Development and production 

Total production of the E9x M3 was 40,092 coupés, 16,219 convertibles and 9,674 saloon. Production of saloon models finished in 2011, with coupés remaining in production until July 5, 2013.

Body styles 
The first body style to be introduced was the coupé, which was previewed at the 2007 Geneva Motor Show and introduced in production form at the 2007 Frankfurt Motor Show on 12 September. The coupé version uses a carbon fibre roof to reduce weight and lower the centre of gravity. In 2010, the coupé and convertible versions received a minor facelift, which included revised LED tail-lights and minor interior trim pieces but it did not get the updated headlights from the regular series.

The E93 convertible version was introduced shortly after the coupé and uses a power retractable hardtop. The leather seats in the convertible version are treated with a coating to reflect sunlight, in order to reduce their tendency to become uncomfortably hot with the top down.

A saloon version was introduced in 2008 and was the second (along with the E36) M3 by generation to be produced in a 4-door body style. The saloon has the same drivetrain and similar external styling as the coupé, however the lack of a carbon fibre roof contributes to a weight increase of  compared to an identically equipped coupé.

M Performance Parts 
M Performance Parts were made for the sixth generation M3.

Special editions

Competition Package (ZCP) 
The "Competition Package" (sometimes known as ZCP) version was released in 2010. The changes related to the suspension and electronic stability control and consisted of:
 Ride height lowered by 
 Revised tuning of the adjustable dampers (Electronic Damping Control)
 An "M" mode for the electronic stability control
 19-inch wheels

GTS 

BMW announced the M3 GTS in November 2009 and began production in 2010. The GTS was designed as a "road-legal clubsport-oriented model" and produced only in the coupé body style. Changes over the regular M3 include an upgraded engine, reduced curb weight, revised suspension, upgraded brakes and adjustable aerodynamics.

The sole transmission option was the 7-speed dual-clutch transmission (M-DCT) and the official  acceleration time for the GTS is 4.4 seconds.

The car weighs  less than the regular M3, due to a lighter centre console and door panels, polycarbonate side and rear windows, a lack of rear seats and the removal of acoustic insulation.

Suspension changes include adjustable camber angle and ride height, a rigidly mounted rear axle and revised dampers. The front brakes were upgraded to 6-piston callipers with  larger discs, and the rear brakes were upgraded to 4-piston callipers with  larger discs. Aerodynamics are adjustable via the front apron and the angle of the rear wing. Production was limited to 135 cars, which sold out quickly.

CRT 

The M3 CRT (Carbon Racing Technology) was a special edition of the M3 saloon that was produced in 2011. The CRT was powered by the same 4.4 litre version of the S65 engine as the GTS, however it retained a higher level of luxury features compared to the track-focussed GTS. The CRT used a carbon fibre bonnet and front seats to reduce weight, resulting in a kerb weight approximately  lower than an equivalently specified version of the regular M3 saloon.

Production was limited to 67 cars, all numbered with a plaque on the dashboard. The official  acceleration time was 4.4 seconds.

DTM Champion Edition 
BMW Motorsport returned to the DTM in 2012, and 54 "DTM Champion Edition" cars were built to commemorate the BMW M3 winning the championship. The unique features of the DTM Champion Edition consisted of visual changes to associate the car with the DTM race car, such as the "Frozen Black" paint colour, stripes over the roof and bootlid, carbon flaps, a gurney flap and matte black wheels. Interior changes included carbon fibre for some interior trim items, an "M Power" logo embroidered on the handbrake grip and a numbered plaque with Spengler's signature and the text "DTM champion 2012" above the glove box. All cars were produced with the dual-clutch transmission.

Lime Rock Park Edition (US) 

In the United States, the M3 Lime Rock Park Edition was produced for the 2013 model year. A total of 200 cars were sold, all coupés painted in the "Fire Orange" colour.

The interior of the Lime Rock Park Edition includes a plaque reading "One of 200".

Frozen Edition 
Due to the GTS version not being available in South Africa, BMW developed the BMW M3 Frozen Edition in 2009. The engine was upgraded to generate , due to an AC Schnitzer intake manifold and changes to the engine management system.

Twenty-five Frozen Edition cars were produced, all with exterior colours of either "Frozen Black" or "Frozen Grey".

Competition Edition Frozen Silver 
In 2012, BMW announced this edition with 40 to be built for US and 100 for Europe.

Built to commemorate the 40th anniversary of BMW's M Division, each model came with "Frozen Silver Metallic" exterior paint. According to BMW, the colour is a special matte paint that adds a metallic lustre to the vehicle. The interior has black leather and palladium silver accessories.

M3 Pickup Prototype 
The M3 Pickup is a one-off custom variant of the M3 which was based on the E93 M3 convertible and publicly announced on April Fool's Day in 2011. It was used as a workshop transport vehicle for BMW M GmbH, replacing their E30 M3 pickup version after 26 years of use. The vehicle was assembled by M GmbH's employees, as well as interns and engineering students.

Motorsport 
The E92 M3 saw BMW return to the Deutsche Tourenwagen Masters (DTM) after a break of 20 years. In its debut season in 2012, the M3 won the drivers championship, the manufacturers championship and five out of ten races for the season.

In endurance racing, the BMW Motorsport/Schnitzer Motorsport M3 GT2 won the 2010 24 Hours of Nürburgring, driven by Jörg Müller, Augusto Farfus, Pedro Lamy, and Uwe Alzen. The M3 also qualified second at the 2010 24 Hours of Spa and led the race until being forced to retire in the final hour due to suspension failure. The M3 won the GT2 category in the ILMC 2010 1000 km of Zhuhai in China.

A GT4 version of the M3 was introduced in 2009 and competed in various races, including finishing third in the GT4 SP10 class at the 2009 24 Hours Nürburgring, and winning its class at the ADAC Westfalenfahrt race at the Nürburgring in April 2009. In July 2009, BMW Motorsport released an M3 GT4 model for sale to private teams and drivers.

In the United States, Rahal Letterman Racing entered two factory-backed E92 M3s in the 2009 American Le Mans Series season, competing in the GT2 category. In 2011, the BMW achieved a 1–2 finish in the 12 Hours of Sebring. In the 2011 American Le Mans Series GT class, BMW Team RLL swept all categories, winning the GT manufacturer, team and driver championships. In 2012, the M3 won the GT class at the 12 Hours of Sebring. The #79 M3 GT2 that competed at Le Mans became the 17th BMW Art Car after it was decorated by Jeff Koons. The M3 GT2 was succeeded by the BMW Z4 GTE in 2013.

F80 generation (2014–2019)  

The M3 version of the F30 3 Series was designated the F80 and was produced from 2014 to 2018. The F80 M3 was powered by the BMW S55 twin-turbocharged straight-six engine, therefore being the first turbocharged M3 model.

The official  acceleration times are 3.9 seconds with the M-DCT transmission and 4.1 seconds with the manual transmission.

The F80 M3 was unveiled, alongside the F82 M4 (its coupé counterpart), at the 2014 North American International Auto Show.

In 2016, a Competition Package became available for the M3 and M4. The official  time was 4.0 seconds with the dual-clutch transmission.

Body styles 
The F80 generation of M3 was produced only as a saloon, following the company's plans to split off the 4 Series coupé and convertible from the 3 Series. To minimise weight, the roof is made of carbon fibre and the bonnet and front quarter panels are made from aluminium.

Facelifts 
The F80 M3's design was updated in (summer) 2015 for the 2016 model year and in (march) 2017 for the 2018 model year. In the former, the taillights were given LEDs, and in the latter, the headlights were restyled and also given newer and more angular LEDs.

M Performance Parts 
M Performance Parts can be fitted to all M3 models. These include a carbon fibre diffuser, a carbon fibre spoiler, a carbon fibre bumper winglet, a splitter and side skirts.

Special editions

M3 Pure 
The Australian-only M3 Pure model was sold as the base model, being cheaper than the regular M3. The M3 Pure has the engine, exhaust and suspension from the Competition Package. Exterior trims include black badges, front grilles, side grilles and exhaust tips, while the interior trim uses a combination of leather and cloth.

M3 CS 

The weight was reduced by  through use of a carbon fibre hood and front splitter, Alcantara interior parts and thinner glass for the side windows.

Production of the CS totalled 1,200 units.

M3 30-Jahre Edition 
To celebrate the 30th anniversary of the introduction of the first M3, BMW produced a limited run of 30-Jahre edition cars. Only 500 were made and distributed worldwide, with 150 of these making their way to the US. The US cars were all equipped with Individual Macao Blue paint, Fjord Blue and Black interior, Competition package and numerous badges and trim denoting the cars as 30-Jahre Edition.

M3 Velocity Edition 
In 2018, BMW produced 20 M3 Velocity Edition models that were only available for purchase to military members stationed in Stuttgart, Germany. The Velocity Edition is equipped with the Competition Package and is only available in the "Fashion Grey Metallic" colour. A laser engraved dash/engine strut denotes the number of 20 cars made.

Motorsport 
With the M3 model now being solely as a saloon, the motor racing activities switched to the M4 (F82) coupé.

Discontinuation 
Production ceased in October 2018, due to the extensive changes required to meet the WLTP emissions regulations. However, the M4 model remained in production.

G80/G81 generation (2020–present)  

The full M version of the G20 3 Series, powered by the BMW S58 turbocharged straight-six engine that debuted in the G01 X3 M. All-wheel drive (xDrive) has been announced as being optional on the new M3, which would represent the first time that an M3 has used a drivetrain layout other than rear-wheel drive. A manual gearbox will be available only with rear wheel drive.  
It will also be available as a Touring (estate) model, marking the first time BMW has offered an M3 Touring. The BMW M3 G80 is on sale as a 2021 model, with the initial prototypes tested at the Nürburgring alongside the BMW M4 G82. It was officially unveiled on 23 September 2020 alongside the new M4.

Updates 
In July 2022, for the 2023 model year, the M3 saloon received the new dual curved display featuring iDrive 8, matching the facelifted, standard 3 Series. It replaces the previous separate digital cockpit and infotainment system with iDrive 7. The M3 Touring launched directly with the new display.

M Performance Parts 
M Performance Parts can be fitted to all models. These includes a wing, carbon fibre side skirts, an M Performance Exhaust system, canards, a carbon fibre splitter, a carbon fibre diffuser and rear ground effects.

Production volumes

References

M3
Sports sedans
Compact executive cars
Cars introduced in 1986
1990s cars
2000s cars
2010s cars
2020s cars
Coupés